Dikgonnye is a village in Kgatleng District of Botswana. The village is located 40 km north-west of Mochudi, and it has a primary school. The population was 431 in 2011 census.

References

Kgatleng District
Villages in Botswana